Schistura minuta is a species of ray-finned fish, a stone loach, in the genus Schistura, a benthic species found in hill streams in the Iyei River drainage in Manipur, India.

References

M
Fish described in 2006